Marianne Weber (born 22 January 1956) is a German rower. She competed in the women's eight event at the 1976 Summer Olympics.

References

External links
 

1956 births
Living people
German female rowers
Olympic rowers of West Germany
Rowers at the 1976 Summer Olympics
People from Esslingen am Neckar
Sportspeople from Stuttgart (region)